Testosterona Pink is a Colombian comedy web television series based on an original idea by Miguel Daza. Written by Héctor Chiquillo and produced by Diana Manosalva, and Ana Hernández. The series revolves around of Germán, played by Juan Carlos Messier, a homosexual who decides to return to heterosexuality.

Cast 
 Juan Carlos Messier as Germán
 Raúl Ocampo as Jerónimo
 Ana Wills as Natalia
 Carlos Hurtado as Alejandro
 Iván López as Daniel

Episodes 
The season will consist of a total of 9 episodes.

References

External links 
 

2017 Colombian television series debuts
Colombian LGBT-related television shows
Spanish-language television shows
Colombian television sitcoms
2017 Colombian television series endings